Anton Ferdinand Leopold, Count of Hohenzollern-Sigmaringen (also known as Count of Hohenzollern-Haigerloch; 4 December 1692 in Sigmaringen – 23 July 1750 at Brühl Palace) was a German nobleman.  He was a various times canon of different cathedral chapters and first minister of the Electorate of Cologne under Elector Clemens August.  From 1702 until his death, he was the ruling Count of Hohenzollern-Haigerloch.

Life 
He was the son of Count Franz Anton and his wife Anna Maria Eusebia of Königsegg-Aulendorf.

In 1706, he joined the cathedral chapter in Cologne.  From 1714 to 1726, he was also canon in Speyer.  In 1725, he was appointed canon in Strasbourg.  In Cologne, he was chorbishop from 1724 to 1727.  In 1727, he became vice dean, and 1731, cathedral dean.  In 1733, he succeeded Ferdinand of Plettenberg as prime minister of the Electorate of Cologne.  However, he had much less political influence than his predecessor.  In 1745, he voted on behalf of Cologne in the election of Emperor Francis I.

He died in 1750, and was buried in the Cologne Cathedral.  He was unmarried and childless.  He was succeeded as Count of Hohenzollern-Haigerloch by his younger brother Franz Christoph Anton.

References 
 F. E. von Mering: Clemens August, Herzog von Baiern, Kurfürst und Erzbischof zu Köln. Biographischer Versuch, Heberle, Cologne, 1851, p. 87 Online
 Rudolf Lill (ed.): Kurfürst Clemens August. Landesherr und Mäzen des 18. Jahrhunderts, DuMont Schauberg, Cologne, 1961, p. 169

External links 
 Entry at Geneall.net

Counts of Hohenzollern-Haigerloch
People from the Electorate of Cologne
House of Hohenzollern
1692 births
1750 deaths
Cathedral deans of Cologne